Lyroneurus is a genus or subgenus of flies in the family Dolichopodidae. Its rank is not currently certain; it has variously been placed as its own genus or as a subgenus of Diaphorus. More recently, it has been suggested by Pollet et al. (2004) to be a synonym of Chrysotus, but some authors maintain generic rank noting that Chrysotus is possibly paraphyletic.

Species
The species below are named assuming Lyroneurus is a separate genus:

Lyroneurus adustus (Wiedemann, 1830)
Lyroneurus annulatus (Macquart, 1842)
Lyroneurus beckeri (Meuffels & Grootaert, 1999)
Lyroneurus chalybeus Röder, 1892
Lyroneurus coeruleocephalus Loew, 1857
Lyroneurus curvispina Van Duzee, 1929
Lyroneurus fratellus Becker, 1922
Lyroneurus laetus Becker, 1922
Lyroneurus luteoviridis Parent, 1935
Lyroneurus marginalis Becker, 1922
Lyroneurus occultus Becker, 1922
Lyroneurus perplexus (Van Duzee, 1929)
Lyroneurus praestans Parent, 1931
Lyroneurus simplex Aldrich, 1896
Lyroneurus suavis Loew, 1857
Lyroneurus willistoni (Van Duzee, 1931)

References

Dolichopodidae genera
Diaphorinae
Taxa named by Hermann Loew